Millburn is a suburban township in Essex County, in the U.S. state of New Jersey. As of the 2020 United States census, the township's population was 21,710, an increase of 1,561 (+7.7%) from the 2010 census count of 20,149, which in turn reflected an increase of 384 (+1.9%) from the 19,765 counted in the 2000 census. Short Hills is an upscale unincorporated community within Millburn.

Millburn was created as a township by an act of the New Jersey Legislature on March 20, 1857, from portions of Springfield Township, when Union County was formed. Earlier known variously as Milltown, Millville, Rum Brook and Vauxhall, the name "Millburn" was adopted before the township was established. The township's name derives from the burn (Scottish for a stream) that powered mills in the area.

The township is home to the South Mountain Reservation, The Mall at Short Hills and the Paper Mill Playhouse, an established regional theater.

New Jersey Monthly magazine ranked Millburn as the 53rd best place to live in New Jersey in its 2008 rankings of the "Best Places to Live" in New Jersey.

Millburn had the highest annual property tax bills in New Jersey in 2018 of $24,308, compared to a statewide average of $8,767. The township had the highest annual bill in 2009 of $19,097, compared to the statewide average of $7,300 that year, which was the highest in the United States. This is primarily a function of high property values, as Millburn had the lowest effective property tax rate in 2014 (1.9%) among the 22 municipalities in Essex County.

The township is one of New Jersey's highest-income communities. In 2000, Millburn had the 6th-highest per capita income in the state, with $76,796. Based on data from the 2006–2010 American Community Survey, the township had a per-capita income of $84,663, ranked 10th in the state. Based on data from the American Community Survey for 2013–2017, Millburn residents had a median household income of $202,862, ranked highest in the state among municipalities with more than 10,000 residents, more than double the statewide median of $76,475.

History

Millburn was an agricultural settlement before it became a Victorian residential community. It was part of the Newark settlements in New Jersey in the 19th century made from Charles II from James, his brother, in the 17th century. Springfield Township was founded in 1783 which included Millburn.

Millburn played a vital role during the Revolutionary War. With George Washington's military camped outside at Morristown and the British assaulting through the Hobart Gap, Millburn was brought into the Revolutionary War. Washington purportedly saw his soldiers on a vital point in the South Mountain Reservation, then known as Washington Rock. The Battle of Springfield in 1780 was the last push of the British into New Jersey and the first fight since Bunker Hill. A token of the war exists in the Parsil family graveyard on White Oak Ridge Road, where Nicholas Parsil was buried after being killed in a clash with the British.

After the Revolution, the Rahway River was dammed in five spots to frame plant lakes. Samuel Campbell created the first paper mill in 1790 and produced banknotes. The majority of the early factories were paper plants, among them the Diamond Mill, that is now the site of the Paper Mill Playhouse. In 1835 the Morris and Essex Railroad was completed, connecting Millburn to enormous urban communities in the east and coal areas in the northwest.

Two unincorporated suburbs were created within its borders.

In June 2007, Millburn celebrated its 150th birthday in its downtown, in one of the biggest celebrations in Millburn history.

Geography

According to the United States Census Bureau, the township had a total area of 9.89 square miles (25.62 km2), including 9.33 square miles (24.17 km2) of land and 0.56 square miles (1.45 km2) of water (5.64%).

Unincorporated communities, localities and place names located partially or completely within the township include Brantwood, Canoe Brook, Short Hills, Washington Rock, White Oak Ridge and Wyoming. Millburn includes the Wyoming district, South Mountain and Millburn center. Short Hills includes Brookhaven, Country Club, Deerfield-Crossroads, Glenwood, Knollwood, Merrywood, Mountaintop, Old Short Hills Estates and White Oak Ridge.

The West Branch of the Rahway River runs through downtown Millburn.

Economy
Dun & Bradstreet has its headquarters in the Short Hills section of Millburn.

Arts and culture

 Paper Mill Playhouse is a 1,200-seat regional theater established in 1938, that has been officially designated as the "State Theatre of New Jersey".
 B'nai Israel synagogue was designed by architect Percival Goodman and features works by Herbert Ferber, Adolph Gottlieb and Robert Motherwell.

Parks and recreation
 Cora Hartshorn Arboretum and Bird Sanctuary – A site owned by the daughter of Short Hills founder Stewart Hartshorn, the  park with its  of trails was donated to the township in 1958.
 Greenwood Gardens – one of sixteen garden preservation projects in the United States overseen by the Garden Conservancy.
 Old Short Hills Park, Gero Park, Taylor Park and Slayton Field Park.

Fishing and kayaking is available on the Rahway River.

Demographics

Millburn has one of the largest Jewish communities in Essex County, along with neighboring Livingston and South Orange. Philip Roth's popular novel Goodbye, Columbus about a newly affluent Jewish family in the 1950s, was set in the Short Hills section of Millburn, and a key scene takes place at the Millburn High School track.

The township has attracted professionals moving out of Manhattan, thanks to direct train service to Penn Station.

In a report performed by the United Way of Northern New Jersey based on 2012 data, around 11% of Millburn households were classified as "Asset Limited, Income Constrained, Employed" households (below a threshold of $50,000 for households below 65, below $35,000 for those over 65), struggling with basic necessities, such as housing, childcare, food, health care, and transportation, compared to 38% statewide and 47% in Essex County.

2010 census

The Census Bureau's 2006–2010 American Community Survey showed that (in 2010 inflation-adjusted dollars) median household income was $165,603 (with a margin of error of +/− $9,937) and the median family income was $194,421 (+/− $14,492). Males had a median income of $136,031 (+/− $14,137) versus $81,152 (+/− $9,621) for females. The per capita income for the borough was $84,663 (+/− $5,971). About 1.3% of families and 1.9% of the population were below the poverty line, including 1.9% of those under age 18 and none of those age 65 or over.

2000 census
As of the 2000 United States census there were 19,765 people, 7,015 households, and 5,604 families residing in the township. The population density was 2,106.2 people per square mile (813.6/km2). There were 7,158 housing units at an average density of 762.8 per square mile (294.6/km2). The racial makeup of the township was 88.91% White, 8.40% Asian, 1.10% African American, 0.05% Native American, 0.03% Pacific Islander, 0.43% from other races, and 1.08% from two or more races. Hispanic or Latino of any race were 2.04% of the population. The most common reported ancestries in 2000 were 13.5% Italian, 12.2% Irish, 11.7% Russian and 11.5% German.

There were 7,015 households, out of which 44.3% had children under the age of 18 living with them, 71.6% were married couples living together, 6.3% had a female householder with no husband present, and 20.1% were non-families. 17.4% of all households were made up of individuals, and 7.7% had someone living alone who was 65 years of age or older. The average household size was 2.82 and the average family size was 3.19.

In the township the population was spread out, with 30.2% under the age of 18, 3.2% from 18 to 24, 28.4% from 25 to 44, 25.1% from 45 to 64, and 13.1% who were 65 years of age or older. The median age was 39 years. For every 100 females, there were 94.1 males. For every 100 females age 18 and over, there were 90.2 males.

The median income for a household in the township was $130,848, and the median income for a family was $158,888. Males had a median income of $100,000+ versus $51,603 for females. The per capita income for the township was $76,796. About 1.2% of families and 1.5% of the population were below the poverty line, including 1.4% of those under age 18 and 1.0% of those age 65 or over.

Government

Local government

Since its incorporation as a municipality in 1857, Millburn has been governed under the Township form of New Jersey municipal government, one of 141 municipalities (of the 564) statewide that use this form, the second-most commonly used form of government in the state. The Township Committee is comprised five members, who are elected directly by the voters at-large in partisan elections to serve three-year terms of office on a staggered basis, with either one or two seats coming up for election each year as part of the November general election in a three-year cycle. At an annual reorganization meeting, the Township Committee selects one of its members to serve as Mayor. A Business Administrator manages the day-to-day functions of the Township.

, members of the Township Committee are Mayor Maggie Miggins (D, term ends December 31, 2023), Deputy Mayor Sanjeev Vinayak (D, term ends December 31, 2023), Tara B. Prupis (D, 2024), Annette Romano (D, 2025), and Michael H. Cohen (D, 2025).

Sandra Haimoff became Mayor in 2008 following the expiration of former mayor Daniel Baer's term on December 31, 2007. Daniel Baer's service had marked the first time in the history of the town that a Democrat held the title of Mayor.

Federal, state, and county representation
Millburn is located in the 11th Congressional District and is part of New Jersey's 27th state legislative district. 

Prior to the 2011 reapportionment following the 2010 Census, Millburn had been in the 21st state legislative district.

Politics
As of March 2011, there were a total of 14,099 registered voters in Millburn, of which 4,512 (32.0%) were registered as Democrats, 3,214 (22.8%) were registered as Republicans and 6,361 (45.1%) were registered as Unaffiliated. There were 12 voters registered as Libertarians or Greens.

In the 2016 presidential election, Democrat Hillary Clinton received 6,719 votes to the Republican's 2,768. In the 2012 presidential election, Democrat Barack Obama received 55.3% of the vote (5,142 cast), ahead of Republican Mitt Romney with 44.0% (4,087 votes), and other candidates with 0.8% (70 votes), among the 11,587 ballots cast by the township's 14,594 registered voters (2,288 ballots were spoiled), for a turnout of 79.4%. In the 2008 presidential election, Democrat Barack Obama received 58.6% of the vote (6,097 cast), ahead of Republican John McCain with 39.8% (4,144 votes) and other candidates with 0.7% (72 votes), among the 10,410 ballots cast by the township's 14,034 registered voters, for a turnout of 74.2%. In the 2004 presidential election, Democrat John Kerry received 55.1% of the vote (5,682 ballots cast), outpolling Republican George W. Bush with 43.9% (4,525 votes) and other candidates with 0.6% (83 votes), among the 10,315 ballots cast by the township's 13,548 registered voters, for a turnout percentage of 76.1.

In the 2013 gubernatorial election, Republican Chris Christie received 63.5% of the vote (3,301 cast), ahead of Democrat Barbara Buono with 35.3% (1,833 votes), and other candidates with 1.3% (65 votes), among the 5,320 ballots cast by the township's 14,670 registered voters (121 ballots were spoiled), for a turnout of 36.3%. In the 2009 gubernatorial election, Republican Chris Christie received 47.9% of the vote (3,308 ballots cast), ahead of  Democrat Jon Corzine with 44.6% (3,080 votes), Independent Chris Daggett with 6.4% (445 votes) and other candidates with 0.4% (27 votes), among the 6,906 ballots cast by the township's 13,913 registered voters, yielding a 49.6% turnout.

Community organizations 
Down the Block, Inc., a 501(c)3 organization, was formed by residents in 2009 to pay bills on behalf of Millburn residents in financial distress.

New Eyes for the Needy is a non-profit organization started in 1932 as New Eyes (incorporated 1948) and based in Short Hills, which provides people in the United States with eyeglasses and sends recycled eyeglasses to needy people overseas.

The Millburn-Short Hills Volunteer First Aid Squad, founded in 1958, provides Emergency Medical Services to the township. They are an all-volunteer agency that does not charge for its services, relying solely on private donations to cover the costs of operating.

Scouts BSA Troop 19 chartered at St. Rose of Lima Church in Short Hills was founded in February 2019 when the Boys Scouts of America opened their program to girls. Troop 19 is one of the first all-girl troops in New Jersey and is part of Lenape Trail District of the Northern New Jersey Council. In 2019, Troop 19 became the first all-girls troop to march in the New York City Veterans Day Parade. St. Rose of Lima Church also sponsors Boy Scout Troop 17, which was founded in 1945.

Education

The Millburn Township Public Schools serve students in pre-kindergarten through twelfth grade. The district is includes five K-4 elementary schools, a district-wide fifth grade school, a middle school and a high school. As of the 2020–21 school year, the district, comprised of eight schools, had an enrollment of 4,697 students and 418.2 classroom teachers (on an FTE basis), for a student–teacher ratio of 11.2:1. Schools in the district (with 2020–21 enrollment data from the National Center for Education Statistics) are 
Deerfield Elementary School with 400 students in grades Pre-K–4, 
Glenwood Elementary School with 357 students in grades K–4, 
Hartshorn Elementary School with 393 students in grades K–4, 
South Mountain Elementary School with 274 students in grades Pre-K–4, 
Wyoming Elementary School with 310 students in grades K–4, 
Washington School with 398 students in grade 5, 
Millburn Middle School with 1,197 students in grades 6–8 and 
Millburn High School with 1,319 students in grades 9–12.

In its 2015 report on "America's Top High Schools", Newsweek ranked Millburn the #1 open-admission and #4 non-magnet school in the nation. It placed 13th overall in the U.S. and 8th in the state among all participating public high schools (including selective admission and magnet schools). All schools ranked above Millburn are selective enrollment per their respective websites and are listed as magnet programs on Wikipedia.

The district's high school was the fifth-ranked public high school in New Jersey out of 339 schools statewide in New Jersey Monthly magazine's September 2014 cover story on the state's "Top Public High Schools", using a new ranking methodology. The school had been ranked 8th in the state of 328 schools in 2012, after being ranked 1st in 2010 out of 322 schools listed. The magazine also ranked Millburn as the top high school in New Jersey in its 2008 rankings.

The influx of younger families into the community has led to significant growth in public school enrollment, with enrollment doubling from 1990 to 2007.

Far Brook School is a private, nonsectarian coeducational day school located in the Short Hills section of Millburn, serving students in nursery through eighth grade, with a 2018–2019 total enrollment of 224 students. The Pingry School's Lower School (K–6) campus is located in Short Hills.

St. Rose of Lima Academy is a Catholic school with 260 students in Pre-K–3 on through 8th grade, operating under the auspices of the Archdiocese of Newark, that was established in 1869 and granted academy status in 2008. In September 2013, the St. Rose of Lima Academy was one of 15 schools in New Jersey to be recognized by the United States Department of Education as part of the National Blue Ribbon Schools Program, an award called the "most prestigious honor in the United States' education system" and which Education Secretary Arne Duncan described as honoring schools that "represent examples of educational excellence".

Transportation

Roads and highways

A variety of roads serve Millburn. Major county routes include CR 510, CR 527 and CR 577. Route 24 and Route 124 also pass through along the southwestern border with Summit. Interstate 78 passes through the very southern tip of the township in the area of exit 49.

Public transportation

Millburn Township is served by two NJ Transit railroad stations along the Morristown Line, providing service to Newark Broad Street Station, Secaucus Junction, and New York Penn Station, as well as to Hoboken Terminal. The Millburn station is located at the intersection of Essex Street and Lackawanna Place near the Millburn Free Public Library, and the Short Hills station is located near The Crescent Street between Hobart Avenue and Chatham Road. The latter station is also the site of the Millburn-Short Hills Historical Society's museum.

New Jersey Transit operates bus service in the township, including the 70 route that stops at the Millburn railroad station on a route between Newark and Livingston, with local service on the 873 route.

Notable people

People who were born in, residents of, or otherwise closely associated with Millburn include:

 Craig Balsam, entertainment industry entrepreneur, Tony Award-winning theatrical producer and film producer
 Michael Lewis Becker (born 1940), advertising executive
 Lee Bickmore (1908–1986), chairman of the board and CEO of Nabisco
 Prince Lorenzo Borghese (born 1973), star of the 9th season of The Bachelor
 Courtney Brosnan (born 1995), professional soccer player who plays as a goalkeeper for West Ham United F.C. Women of the Women's Super League
 Scott Brunner (born 1957), former professional quarterback for the New York Giants
 Andrew Catalon (born 1980), sportscaster who has announced NFL on CBS, PGA Tour on CBS, College Basketball on CBS and NCAA March Madness
 Bill Chinnock (1947–2007), singer-songwriter and guitarist who was part of the Asbury Park music scene with Bruce Springsteen in the late 1960s
 Buzzy Cohen (born 1985), recording music industry executive and trivia enthusiast best known for his association with the game show Jeopardy!
 Ralph Cicerone (1943–2016), atmospheric scientist and administrator, who served as president of the National Academy of Sciences
 Richard Coogan (1914–2014), actor best known for playing the lead role in Captain Video and His Video Rangers
 Leon Cooperman (born 1943), businessman, investor and philanthropist who is chairman and CEO of Omega Advisors, Inc.
 Joseph P. Day (1874–1944), early land auctioneer and real-estate broker
 Ina Drew, former Chief Investment Officer at JP Morgan Chase who resigned following the 2012 JPMorgan Chase trading loss that resulted in billions in losses to the bank
 Pablo Eisenberg (born 1932), scholar, social justice advocate and former tennis player.
 Daniel Errico, children's book author and children's media content creator who is the creator and executive producer of Hulu's kids TV series The Bravest Knight
 John Ferolito, the founder and current owner of Arizona Beverage Company
 James C. Fletcher (1919–1991), 4th and 7th Administrator of NASA
 William R. Forstchen (born 1950), author
 Martin S. Fox (1924–2020), publisher who served as President of the Jewish Telegraphic Agency
 Grace Hartigan (1922–2008), Abstract Expressionist painter and a significant member of the New York School of the 1950s and 1960s
 Anne Hathaway (born 1982), actress
 Herbert G. Hopwood (1898–1966), Commander in chief of the United States Pacific Fleet from 1958 to 1960
 Ariel Horn (born ), novelist and teacher
 Dara Horn (born 1977), novelist and professor of literature
 Mia Sinclair Jenness (born 2005), actress
 Elliott Kalan (born 1981), head writer for The Daily Show
 Peter Kellogg (born 1943), director of the Wall Street investment firm Spear, Leeds & Kellogg, which was sold to Goldman Sachs in 2000 for $5.5 billion
 Joe Kernen (born 1956), CNBC news anchor and host of Squawk Box
 Irwin I. Kimmelman (1930–2014), politician who served in both houses of the New Jersey Legislature and served as the Attorney General of New Jersey from 1982–1986
 Eileen Kraus (1938–2017), business executive who broke the glass ceiling to become the first woman to run a major bank in Connecticut
 Igor Larionov (born 1960), center who played for the New Jersey Devils
 Conor Leslie (born 1991), actress
 David Levithan (born 1972, class of 1990) young adult fiction author and editor
 Robert D. Lilley (1912–1986), businessman who served as the president of the American Telephone and Telegraph Company (AT&T) from 1972 to 1976
 Betty Liu, Bloomberg TV anchor
 Monroe Jay Lustbader (1931–1996), politician who served in the New Jersey General Assembly from 1992 until his death, where he represented the 21st Legislative District
 Robert Marcus, CEO of Time Warner Cable
 Billy McFarland (born 1991), entrepreneur and founder of the Fyre Festival
 John C. McGinley (born 1959), actor
 Robert Mulcahy (1932–2022), athletic director at Rutgers University
 Maureen Ogden (born 1928), seven-term member of the New Jersey General Assembly who served as Mayor of Millburn from 1979 to 1981
 C. Milford Orben (1898–1975), politician who served five terms in the New Jersey General Assembly
 Julie Parsonnet, infectious disease expert
 Sondra Perl, Professor Emerita of English at Lehman College and director of the Ph.D. in Composition and Rhetoric at the Graduate Center of the City University of New York
 Belva Plain (born 1919), author
 Mary Reckford (born 1992), rower who competed in the women's lightweight double sculls event at the 2020 Summer Olympics
 Brian Rolston (born 1973), professional hockey player
 Alex Rosenberg (born 1991), basketball player who plays for Hapoel Afula B.C. of the Israeli National League
 Peter Rost (born 1959), author, speaker, expert witness and drug industry whistleblower
 Bess Rous, actress
 Annie Russell (1864–1936), British-American theatrical actress
 Camille Sabie (1902–1998), athlete who represented the United States at the 1922 Women's World Games, winning gold medals in the 110 yd hurdles and standing long jump and a bronze medal in the conventional long jump
 Laura Sydell (born 1961), former senior technology reporter for Public Radio International's Marketplace, and a regular reporter on for National Public Radio's All Things Considered, Morning Edition, and Weekend Edition
 Patti Stanger (born 1961), matchmaker
 Janet Sorg Stoltzfus, (1931–2004), educator, who established the Ta'iz Cooperative School, the first non-religious school in north Yemen.
 Carl Van Duyne (1946–1983), sailor who competed in the Finn event at the 1968 Summer Olympics
 Peter Van Sant (born 1953), reporter 48 Hours
 Arthur T. Vanderbilt (1888–1957), judge and judicial reformer who served as Chief Justice of the New Jersey Supreme Court from 1948 to 1957
 James Wallwork (born 1930), politician who served in both houses of the New Jersey Legislature
 Wang Yung-ching (1917–2008), former CEO and co-founder of Formosa Plastics Group
 Thomas Watson Jr. (1914–1993), second President of IBM and United States Ambassador to the Soviet Union
 Joel Weingarten, former member of the New Jersey General Assembly
 Zygi Wilf (born 1950), owner of the Minnesota Vikings
 Rachel Zoe (born 1971), fashion stylist
 Alan Zweibel (born 1950), television producer and writer

References

External links

 Millburn Township website
 Millburn Township Public Schools
 
 School Data for the Millburn Township Public Schools, National Center for Education Statistics
 https://millburnlibrary.org/ Millburn Public Library]
 Millburn-Short Hills 4th of July Committee
 "If You're Thinking of Living In/Millburn Township, N.J.; A Town Where Both Halves Live Well", The New York Times, July 16, 2000, by Jerry Cheslow
 Scouts BSA Troop 19 (girls) – St. Rose of Lima Church, Short Hills

 
1857 establishments in New Jersey
Populated places established in 1857
Township form of New Jersey government
Townships in Essex County, New Jersey